Kažan-Haradok is an agrotown in Belarus. The name may be transliterated in various other ways, including Kozhan Gorodok (from Russian), Kozhanhorodok (from Yiddish), Kazhan-Haradok, Kozhan-Grudek, Kazhaneradok, Kozhangrudek, Kurzanhradek. The town is located on the bank of the Tsna River,  from its confluence with the Prypiat River.

History 
Excavations reveal human activity in the area around the 5th to 7th centuries AD. However, Kažan-Haradok is first mentioned in 1493, at the time called Гарадзец (roughly "Gorodets"). It was granted city rights in the 16th century. During the 17th century there was Calvinist activity in the town. A Jewish population is also noted around the mid-17th century. The town had been part of the Polish–Lithuanian Commonwealth, but in the Third Partition of Poland around 1795, it came under the Russian Empire territory. The Church of Saint Nicholas was built in 1818.

Kažan-Haradok was proclaimed part of the Belarusian People's Republic in 1918, and the next year became part of the Byelorussian Soviet Socialist Republic. After the Treaty of Riga (1921), the town was included in the territory of the Second Polish Republic.

In 1939, the Soviet Union retook the town and annexed Western Byelorussia, and Kažan-Haradok again became part of the Byelorussian SSR. Following the 1991 collapse of the Soviet Union, it is part of independent Belarus.

Jewish population 

Jews are mentioned in the town from the mid-17th century. At the beginning of the 20th century, about half of the Jews left the town, and there were three synagogues, one of them belonging to Stolin Hasidism.

Between the World Wars, many Jews emigrated to Argentina and elsewhere, leaving about 800 Jews in the town, about a third of its inhabitants.

On 5 July 1941, during Operation Barbarossa, the town was taken over by Nazi Germany, who rounded up Jews in a ghetto where they were subjected to various decrees. During a massacre on 2–3 September 1942, some 700 Jews who remained in the ghetto were murdered. The synagogue built around 1880 was burned. The perpetrators included personnel of the German Order Police from Police Battalions 69 and 306.

The Soviet Extraordinary State Commission investigated the massacre and uncovered a grave containing 937 Jews, including 325 women and 301 children. There was only one survivor. A monument now stands at this location.

See also
 History of the Jews in Belarus
 The Holocaust in Belarus

References

Bibliography

External links

 

Populated places in Brest Region
Agrotowns in Belarus
Nowogródek Voivodeship (1507–1795)
Pinsky Uyezd
Polesie Voivodeship
Jewish communities
Jewish Belarusian history
Holocaust locations in Belarus
Historic Jewish communities in the Russian Empire